Thorius boreas, commonly known as the boreal thorius, is a species of salamander in the family Plethodontidae. It is endemic to Oaxaca, Mexico, and only known from the Sierra Juárez. Its natural habitats are pine-oak and fir forests, often at forest edges. It is threatened by habitat loss (logging), although it does explain the dramatic decline that this species has seen.

References

Thorius
Endemic amphibians of Mexico
Fauna of the Sierra Madre de Oaxaca
Amphibians described in 1994
Taxonomy articles created by Polbot